Matthew Gentzkow (born April 27, 1975) is an American economist and a professor of economics at Stanford University.  Previously, he was the Richard O. Ryan Professor of Economics and Neubauer Family Faculty Fellow at the University of Chicago Booth School of Business. He was awarded the 2014 John Bates Clark Medal. He was elected a member of the National Academy of Sciences in 2022.

Academic career
Gentzkow received his A.B. in Economics in 1997, A.M. in Economics in 2002, and Ph.D. in Economics in 2004, all from Harvard University. His research is in the fields of Industrial Organization and Political Economy.

Selected publications

References

External links
 Website at Stanford

1975 births
Living people
21st-century American economists
Harvard College alumni
Stanford University Department of Economics faculty
University of Chicago faculty
Fellows of the Econometric Society
Fellows of the American Academy of Arts and Sciences
Harvard Graduate School of Arts and Sciences alumni
Members of the United States National Academy of Sciences